Unclean may refer to:

 Unclean animals, those whose consumption or handling is labeled a taboo
 Unclean food, in Jewish dietary custom 
 Ritually impure, in various religions
 Unclean hands, a term in contract law
 Unclean (album), a 1998 album by Rorschach Test
 "Unclean" (song), from 1984
 Unclean spirit, in Christianity
 Unclean vocals, in metal or punk music

See also
 Clean and Unclean (disambiguation)
 Impurity (disambiguation)
 Aśuddhatā, in Hindu religion
 Dirty
 Menstrual taboo